The Asia-Pacific Unicycle Competition (or APUC for short) is a regional unicycling games event that is held biennially, in alternative years from the Unicycling World Championships Unicon. The event has typically been held over a weekend where competitors from around Asia-Pacific gather in various unicycle games.

Origins 
APUC was started as a progression of the somewhat-impromptu unicycle hockey matches that were set up between a travelling Asian/Australasia team and a host team. In 2007, a unicycle hockey competition was formalized and with location support and help from the (now defunct) Ngee Ann Polytechnic Unicycle Club, the first Asia-Pacific Unicycle Competition was held in Singapore.

The Competition lasted a weekend and consisted of a day of Unicycle Hockey with social events and a Taekwondo showcase by the Korean Unicycling Association. The countries that participated included Hong Kong, Australia, South Korea and Singapore.

Current 

APUC draws guidance from the unicycle sports offered at the largest international unicycle event, the Unicycling World Championships Unicon. While there is no fixed guidelines as yet to what events are compulsory at each APUC, Unicycle Hockey, Track and Freestyle have been the most-organized competitions. At past APUCs, other competitions have included track and field, muni, a 10 km race, and trials.

A large goal of APUC is in promoting friendship and exchange and social activities form a good portion of the games too. Activities like performance showcases, unicycle sumo and street rides play a large role in shaping the event. Events are conducted based on the rules of the International Unicycling Federation.

Countries That Have Participated in APUC 

Countries that have participated in APUC include:
 Australia
 Hong Kong
 Japan
 Philippines
 Singapore
 South Korea
 Taiwan
 Macau

Competition History

See also
 Eurocycle (European unicycling championships)
 International Unicycling Federation

External links
 International Unicycling Federation
 Competition Rules 2017
 Hong Kong Wins Gold as Asia’s top unicyclists take to Lamma’s downhill trails
 Singapore Unicyclists Website

References

Unicycling